The Behdzi Ahda' First Nation is a Dene First Nations band government in the Northwest Territories. The band's main community is Colville Lake.

The Behdzi Ahda' First Nation is a member of the Sahtu Dene Council. Under the Sahtu Dene and Metis Comprehensive Land Claim Agreement, the First Nation shares title to 41,437 square kilometers of land in the Sahtu Region.

References

First Nations in the Northwest Territories
Dene governments